Montague (Monty) Banks (18 July 1897 – 7 January 1950), born Mario Bianchi, was a 20th century Italian-born American comedian, film actor, director and producer who achieved success in the UK and the United States.

Career
Banks was born Mario Bianchi in Cesena, Italy.  In 1914, Bianchi emigrated to the United States, first trying his luck on the New York stage. By 1918, he was an actor in Hollywood with the Arbuckle Company, performing in over 35 silent short comedies by the early 1920s, and then, starring in feature-length action comedy-thrillers as Play Safe (1927). (A large excerpt from this movie is included in Robert Youngson's compilation film Days of Thrills and Laughter (1961) and the car-to-train transfer stunt explained in the 1980 documentary series Hollywood).

Like Harold Lloyd, the comedy-thrillers he produced were popular but became increasingly risky and Banks was seriously injured after being roped to the back of a car and dragged down a cliff face.

With the arrival of sound films, Banks's strong Italian accent forced him to phase out his acting career in favor of working as a gagman and director. He directed Laurel and Hardy in their film Great Guns, under the name "Montague Banks".

By the 1930s he had relocated to the United Kingdom where he produced and directed “quota quickies“ for the comedy team of Leslie Fuller and Syd Courtenay, and later the breakthrough films of George Formby and Gracie Fields. After Warner Bros. purchased Teddington Studios outright in 1934, he directed (and occasionally acted in) various comedies and crime stories intended for UK release only, featuring actors of the caliber of Douglas Fairbanks Jr., Edmund Gwenn and Margaret Lockwood.

Banks subsequently  became an associate producer at 20th Century Fox.

Personal life
He was married to American actress Gladys Frazin. The marriage was not a happy one and they divorced on 29 April 1932 as a result of her abusive behaviour. She subsequently committed suicide in March 1939.

Banks met British singer and actress Gracie Fields in 1935, subsequently directing her in four of her films, and they married in March 1940. As an Italian national, he would have been classified as an 'enemy alien' in Britain during World War II. Consequently, he and Fields left the UK for Canada initially, and then the neutral United States in order to prevent his internment. Italian American internment also came into place in the United States during 1941 and 1942, affecting thousands of Italians, but this was eventually relaxed.

Death
Banks held dual Italian and American citizenship. He died, reportedly in the arms of Fields, while traveling on the Orient Express train just outside Arona, Italy, of a heart attack, aged 52.

Aula Didattica Monty Banks
In his home town of Cesena a Foundation was created in honor of Banks, entitled the Aula Didattica Monty Banks. It is "an initiative promoted by the municipality, the course is open to all and provides the opportunity to create videos".

Selected filmography

Actor

 A Scrap of Paper (1918)
 The Sheriff (1918)
 Camping Out (1919)
 Love (1919)
 Too Much Johnson (1919)
 Hot Sands (1924)
 Racing Luck (1924)
 Atta Boy (1926)
 Horse Shoes (1927)
 Flying Luck (1927)
 Play Safe (1927)
 Chasing Choo Choos (1927) two-reel version of Play Safe (1927) showing only the train chase
 Adam's Apple (1928)
 A Perfect Gentleman (1928)
 Weekend Wives (1928)
 Atlantic (1929)
 You Made Me Love You (1933)
 Heads We Go (1933)
 The Girl in Possession (1934)
 Falling in Love (1935)
 So You Won't Talk (1935)
 Blood and Sand (1941)
 A Bell for Adano (1945)

Director

 Hot Sands (1924)
 Cocktails (1928)
 Why Sailors Leave Home (1930)
 The Black Hand Gang (1930)
 The Compulsory Husband (1930)
 Almost a Honeymoon (1930)
 What a Night! (1931)
 Old Soldiers Never Die (1931)
 The Wife's Family (1931)
 Poor Old Bill (1931)
 Not So Quiet on the Western Front (1932)
 Love and Luck (1932)
 Kiss Me Sergeant (1932)
 Money for Nothing (1932)
 For the Love of Mike (1932)
 Tonight's the Night (1932)
 Leave It to Me (1933)
 You Made Me Love You (1933)
 Heads We Go (1933)
 Father and Son (1934)
 The Church Mouse (1934)
 Man of the Moment (1935)
 Falling in Love (1935) (also acted)
 Hello, Sweetheart (1935)
 18 Minutes (1935)
 No Limit (1935)
 Keep Your Seats, Please (1936)
 Queen of Hearts (1936)
 We're Going to Be Rich (1938)
 Keep Smiling (1938)
 Shipyard Sally (1939)
 Great Guns (1941)

References

Sources

External links

 
 
 
 Notes for an essay on the film career of Monty Banks
 Monty Banks at Virtual History

1897 births
1950 deaths
American male film actors
American male comedy actors
American male silent film actors
Italian male film actors
Italian male silent film actors
Italian film directors
Italian emigrants to the United States
People from Cesena
Silent film comedians
20th-century Italian male actors
20th-century American male actors